XHO-FM (93.5 MHz) is a Spanish news/talk radio radio station that serves the Brownsville, Texas (United States) / Matamoros, Tamaulipas (Mexico) border area.

History
XEO received its concession on August 24, 1946. The station was initially owned by José María González, a prominent businessman in Matamoros and Nuevo Laredo who died in 1950. In 1949, XEO began simulcasting in Reynosa on XEOR; another station, XEOQ-AM, was set up in Río Bravo in 1960.
On December 31, 2018, XEO-AM migrated to FM as XHO-FM 93.5.

XEO-AM closed down April 9, 2020.

HD Radio

XHO-FM broadcasts in HD Radio and broadcasts 3 subchannels. Aside from the HD1, these additional subchannels are also on XHEOQ-FM:
HD1: Notigape 93.5
HD2: Radio Fórmula 1° Cadena
HD3: W Radio
HD4: El Heraldo Radio

No authorization is on file with the IFT for these additional services. The HD2 sub was ESPN Deportes Radio until that network ceased operations on September 8, 2019; Unanimo was created with the goal of attracting the network's former affiliates and talent.

References

Spanish-language radio stations
Radio stations in Matamoros, Tamaulipas